Kushkari is a small town located in Bansihari subdivision of Dakshin Dinajpur district in West Bengal, India. The postal code of Kushkari is 733121.

Population 

The estimated population of Kushkari is 2000 to 3000.

Location 
It is situated 8 km away from sub-district headquarter Buniadpur. Balurghat is the district headquarter of this town.

Banking facilities 

 United Bank of India, Kushkari Branch.
 Punjab National Bank, Kushkari Branch.

Education 

 Kushkari K.B.B.S High School, established in 1961 and it is managed by the Department of Education.
 Kushkari F.P. School, established in 1963 and it is managed by the Department of Education.
 Kushkari Adarsha Vidhyapith (K.G), established in 1992 and it is managed by the Pvt. Unaided.

See also 

 Buniadpur, city in Dakshin Dinajpur.
 Kalyani, village in Dakshin Dinajpur.

References 

Cities and towns in Dakshin Dinajpur district